Joseph Palmisano (November 19, 1902 – November 5, 1971) was a professional baseball player.  He was a catcher for one season (1931) with the Philadelphia Athletics, compiling a .227 batting average in 44 at-bats, with four runs batted in.

An alumnus of the Georgia Institute of Technology, he was born in West Point, Georgia and died in Albuquerque, New Mexico at the age of 68.

External links

1902 births
1971 deaths
Philadelphia Athletics players
Major League Baseball catchers
Baseball players from Georgia (U.S. state)
Wilson Bugs players
Mobile Bears players
Montgomery Lions players
Memphis Chickasaws players
Portland Beavers players
Atlanta Crackers players
Birmingham Barons players
Georgia Tech Yellow Jackets baseball players
People from West Point, Georgia
Kannapolis Towelers players